Good Guys Wear Black is a 1978 American martial arts action film starring Chuck Norris and directed by Ted Post. This was the second film to feature Norris as the star, following Breaker! Breaker! (1977). However, this is the one that Norris considers his "breakthrough".

Following years of kung fu film imports from Hong Kong action cinema during the 1970s, most notably Bruce Lee films followed by Bruceploitation flicks, Good Guys Wear Black launched Chuck Norris as the first successful homegrown American martial arts star, having previously been best known for his film debut as a villain in Bruce Lee's Way of the Dragon (1972). Good Guys Wear Black distinguished itself from earlier martial arts films with its distinctly American setting, characters, themes, and politics, a formula which Norris continued with the similarly successful Force of One (1979). The film featured a first screen appearance by Norris' brother Aaron Norris and the final appearance of Lloyd Haynes.

Plot
In 1973, United States Senator Conrad Morgan (James Franciscus), the chief delegate diplomat in negotiating the terms of the end of the Vietnam War, made a deal in Paris, France with Kuong Yen; a North Vietnamese negotiator. The deal called for Yen to release certain key CIA POWs in exchange for Morgan setting up a death-trap for an elite group of CIA assassins, known as the Black Tigers. The treaty was signed and the Black Tigers were sent into the Vietnam jungle to their unwitting demise, having incorrectly been told that they were on a mission to liberate American POWs. However, the negotiators failed to account for one thing: the commandos' team leader was Major John T. Booker (Chuck Norris). Despite all odds, Booker survives, as do the four men wise enough to have remained in his general vicinity.

Five years after returning from Vietnam, Booker, now living in Los Angeles, is working as a political science professor at UCLA, and with a hobby of race-car driving. At UCLA, Booker lectures on how the war should not have happened, and that the U.S. should not have been involved. Sitting in on one of his lectures is a bright female reporter named Margaret (Anne Archer) who has some very specific questions about the botched rescue mission. To their shock, someone is slowly killing all the surviving members of the special forces team.

Booker is suddenly thrown back into his past when Morgan's appointment as Secretary of State spurs Yen to blackmail his ex-negotiations buddy into making good on his unfinished deal: the extermination of the Black Tigers.

Cast

 Chuck Norris as Major John T. Booker, The Black Tigers
 Anne Archer as Margaret
 James Franciscus as Senator Conrad Morgan
 Lloyd Haynes as Murray Saunders
 Dana Andrews as Edgar Harolds
 Jim Backus as Albert, The Apartment Doorman
 Lawrence P. Casey as Mike Potter, The Black Tigers
 Anthony Mannino as Gordie Jones, The Black Tigers
 Soon-Tek Oh as Major Mhin Van Thieu, The Black Tigers
 Joe Bennett as Lou Goldberg, The Black Tigers
 Jerry Douglas as Joe Walker, The Black Tigers
 Stack Pierce as Holly Washington, The Black Tigers
 Michael Payne as Mitch, The Black Tigers
 David Starwalt as Steagle, The Black Tigers
 Aaron Norris as Al, The Black Tigers
 Don Pike as Hank, The Black Tigers
 Benjamin J. Perry as Finney, The Black Tigers
 Kathy McCullen as Kelly
 Michael Stark as Pitman
 James Bacon as Senator
 Hatsuo Uda as Shoeshine Man
 Virginia Wing as Mrs. Mhin Van Thieu
 Viola Harris as Airline Ticket Agent
 Jacki Robins as Fat Lady
 Pat E. Johnson as CIA Agent
 Warren Smith as James, Morgan's Chauffeur
 Dick Shoemaker as Newscaster

Production
Norris had been offered a number of karate films but turned them down because he did not want to be limited. "Bruce Lee movies were all karate with a little story thrown in. I want to have a story with some karate scenes."

Norris said a friend wrote the script from a storyline he devised with one of his students. "My country wasn't built on sacrificing people to expedite principles", said Norris.

Norris said he "peddled" the script "all over Hollywood. The night before I was to meet this producer – I'd gone through everyone; he was the last – I thought, 'What can I say to this guy that I haven't said to everyone that's turned me down?' I went to bed, and about 2 o'clock in the morning, the answer popped into my head. And when I met the producer, he asked me the same question the others asked, 'Chuck, why will this movie make money?' And I said, 'First of all, there's four million karate people in America. They all know who I am. And if only half of them go to the movie, that's a $6 million gross on a $1 million budget.' And he said, 'Sounds good to me'."

The film was produced by Allan Bodoh, Mitchell Cannold and Michael Leone. Bodoh ran Mar Vista Productions, who in a two-year period made Dirt, Acapulco Gold, Dogs and The Great Smokey Roadblock.

Norris said during filming that he compared "Breaker! Breaker! with Clint Eastwood's A Fistful of Dollars and Good Guys Wear Black with Dirty Harry."

Filming started in May 1977. There was an excellent support cast including Dana Andrews. "I do one film a year just to keep my hand in", said Andrews.

"I want to be as big in the movie industry as I've been in the karate industry", said Norris. ""I know I can do it because I've got the faith to do it."

Norris said his character of Booker "had more feeling than the Clint Eastwood characters. Booker's sensitive, caring about people, but if pushed he can take care of the situation. That's like me. I'm an easy going guy but in the ring I have a fanatical desire to win. I want Booker to be someone people can relate to, a hero to worship. Take Bruce Lee, who was an Oriental but able to pull Caucasians. I'm taking a little from Eastwood, a little from Lee, and a little special effects from James Bond. John T Booker is someone moviegoers can emulate, to be that kind of person, a guy who doesn't push his weight around, an easygoing person who can be dangerous."
Chuck Norris had a long dialogue scene with James Franciscus about the Vietnam War. Steve McQueen, who Norris knew, saw it and advised Norris to let support characters take care of the exposition, "then when there's something important to say, you say it." "Let the co-stars do the b.s. dialogue", Norris says McQueen told him. "I do it. Eastwood does it. Bronson does it."

Norris later stated:

Release

Rating
The film was originally rated R but Norris lobbied successfully to have it changed to PG. "My argument was the strong, positive image I project on the screen", he said. "The word karate, unfortunately, connotes violence to many people. Actually, it's a means of avoiding violent situations, and a form of defense if you have no choice and you're backed into a corner."

Distribution
The film was distributed by American Cinema Releasing.

Reception

Box office
After opening on five screens in Denver on June 2, 1978, the movie would go on to gross $18 million at the US box office, due in part to a year-long publicity tour Norris did. (The actor estimated he did over 2,000 interviews in a year and says he had to go to hospital for laryngitis.)

Critical response
Linda Gross of the Los Angeles Times called it "cynical, reasonably entertaining... the slick, efficient murders are less gory to watch than disturbing to contemplate." The Washington Post said "the little plot it [the film] does have goes a long way." Tom Buckley of The New York Times said the film was "short on everything."

The 1996 movie guide "Seen That, Now What?", the film was given the rating of "C-", stating that "the serious-minded plot is poorly matched with the karate-chopping action sequences, and Norris' fancy footwork only occassionally takes fire."

"The first time I saw myself, I didn't feel embarrassed yet thought I could be better", said Norris. "But, by the fourth viewing, I wanted to hide behind a chair."

According to Norris, the critics said that "I was the worst thing in 50 years. Well, I wasn't good, but my feelings were hurt. I said, 'I'm not trying to be Dustin Hoffman; I just want to project a strong positive hero image on the screen.' I went to Steve [McQueen], and he said, 'In Good Guys you talk too much. Too much dialogue. Let the character actors lay out the plot. Then, when there's something important to say, you say it, and people will listen. Anyway, you'll get better as an actor. You should have seen me in The Blob."

The producers went on to make Go Tell the Spartans with Ted Post.

The film was meant to be the first in a series. However no further Booker movies resulted.

Other media

In popular culture
Chuck Norris' character in The Expendables 2 is named Booker "The Lone Wolf", in homage to John T. Booker in Good Guys Wear Black. (It also references his movie “Lone Wolf McQuade.”)

See also
 Chuck Norris filmography

References

External links
 
 

1978 films
1970s action films
American action films
American martial arts films
Films directed by Ted Post
Films scored by Craig Safan
Films set in 1973
Films set in 1978
Films set in Los Angeles
Films set in Paris
Vietnam War films
1978 martial arts films
1970s English-language films
1970s American films